BBI Development NFI SA (BBI Development National Collective Investment Scheme) is a joint-stock company listed on the Warsaw Stock Exchange. The company focuses on Warsaw's real estate market.

The main commercial projects of the company in Warsaw are:
 Plac Unii, an office and commercial building at Puławska street
 Praga Koneser Center, a complex of cultural and entertainment facilities located on the premises of the former Warsaw Vodka Factory "Koneser"
 The Nowy Sezam, an office and commercial building located at the junction of Marszałkowska and Świętokrzyska street
 Roma Tower, a skyscraper at the junction of Nowogrodzka and Emilia Plater's street
 A home in Dolna street (Polish: Dom na Dolnej)
 The Foksal Residence; in 2011 it was selected "Construction of the Year" by the Polish Association of Construction Engineers and Technicians

The main shareholder of BBI Development NFI SA is BBI Investment, a private company from Poznań. Up to December 29, 2006 the company operated under the name of National Investment Fund "Piast".

References

Warsaw Stock Exchange
Real estate companies of Poland
Companies based in Warsaw